Ester is a former civil parish in the municipality of Castro Daire in the district of Viseu, Portugal. In 2013, the parish merged into the new parish Parada de Ester e Ester. It has 11.5 km2 and had 220 inhabitants in the 2011 census.

References

Former parishes of Portugal
2013 disestablishments in Portugal
Populated places disestablished in 2013
Freguesias of Castro Daire